Dimotiko Theatro is a station in Piraeus, Greece. It is the southwestern terminus of Athens Metro Line 3. It opened in October 10, 2022, as part of the Line 3 extension to Piraeus.

History
In February 2009, construction of Evangelistria station was cancelled, thus making Dimotiko Theatro the planned terminus of the extension. Construction started in 2012 and was due to be completed in 2017 but was pushed back to 2022, mainly due to problems regarding the construction of  station. The TBM arrived at Dimotiko Theatro in November 28, 2017.

Entrances
The station has three entrances. One at Venizelou Square, one at Korai Square and one at Pavlou Bakoyianni Square. The entrances at Venizelou and Korai Square are ADA accessible.

Tram stop

The tram stop that connects with Dimotiko Theatro is called Dimarcheio, after the nearby town hall of the Piraeus Municipality. It is located between the two halves of Korai Square.

Dimarcheio opened on 15 December 2021, as part of the extension of the Athens Tram to Piraeus. Dimarcheio is part of the Piraeus loop, and serves westbound Line 7 trams towards .

Gallery

References

External links
Dimotiko Theatro Station construction videos

Athens Metro stations
Athens Tram stops